The  2018–19 season will be the xth season of competitive football by Botoșani, and the yth consecutive in Liga I. Botoșani will compete in the Liga I and in Cupa României.

Previous season positions

Competitions

Liga I

The Liga I fixture list was announced on 5 July 2018.

Regular season

Table

Results summary

Results by round

Matches

Relegation round

Table

Results summary

Position by round

Matches

Cupa României

Botoșani will enter the Cupa României at the Round of 32.

See also

 2018–19 Cupa României
 2018–19 Liga I

References

FC Botoșani seasons
Botoșani, FC